Hitova Ayemi (born 9 November 1997) is an Indian footballer who currently plays as a forward for Minerva Punjab.

Career
Hitova had previously played for Fateh Hyderabad A.F.C. and DSK Shivajians football academy. At the age of 15, he was invited by Shillong Lajong FC and after a short stint, he went to South Korea to train for 3 months. While he was in DSK Shivajians , he also played in the Durand Cup for the senior team.

Career statistics

Club

Notes

References

1997 births
Living people
People from Kohima
Footballers from Nagaland
Indian footballers
Association football forwards
Shillong Lajong FC players
DSK Shivajians FC players
Fateh Hyderabad A.F.C. players
RoundGlass Punjab FC players
I-League 2nd Division players
I-League players